The 2007 Canadian Senior Curling Championships were held March 18-25 at the Colisée de Trois-Rivières in Trois-Rivières, Quebec. 

Alberta won both the men's and women's events. In the men's final, Edmonton's Pat Ryan rink defeated Ontario's Bob Turcotte, while on the women's side, Lethbridge's Diane Foster team beat British Columbia's Kathy Smiley. The winning teams represented Canada at the 2008 World Senior Curling Championships.

Men's standings

Playoffs

Women's standings

Tie breaker
 7-6

Playoffs

References
 
Internet Archive - Standings
Internet Archive - Teams 
Internet Archive - Schedule
Alberta sweeps senior curling nationals - CBC sports 
Canadian Seniors start Saturday in Trois-Rivières - Curling Quebec 
Stienbachonline.com Scoreboard

2007
Senior Curling Championships
Sport in Trois-Rivières
Curling competitions in Quebec
Canadian Senior Curling
March 2007 sports events in Canada